Operation Python was carried out by the Allied commando unit Z Special Unit, during World War II. The objective of the mission was to set up a wireless station near Labian Point in North Borneo and undertake covert operations reporting on the sea lane of the Imperial Japanese Navy in the Sibutu Passage and the Balabac Strait of the Sulu Sea. The operation was split into Python I and Python II.

Their first task was to plant three of their fellow operators with their radio transmitter at a safe distance, so that coded intelligence could be sent back to Australia. In their information forays and reconnaissance, they traveled many hundreds of miles at great risk using Hoehn military folboats along the coast and accessible inland waters.

Operation Python I 
Led by Major F. G. L. Chester, the Z Special Unit operatives landed along Labian Point in early October 1943. They established an observation post overlooking Sibutu Channel and reported shipping movement to Darwin by radio, reconnoitered islands off the north coast, and worked on establishing intelligence networks. They also supported and provided equipment and stores for Filipino guerrillas under the command of an American officer, Captain J. A. Hamner.

Operation Python II 
In January 1944, Bill Jinkins led Z Special Unit operatives with the objective of organising the native population for guerrilla warfare. Two of the six members of the team were captured and killed. These early efforts did not bear any significant results.

References 
Feuer, A. B. (2006). Australian Commandos: Their Secret War against the Japanese in WWII, Stackpole Books, .
Hoehn, John. (2011). Commando Kayak: The use of Australian folboats during the Pacific Campaign. hirschbooks.net & ozatwar.com/hoehn . 
Sturma, Michael (2006) Death at a Distance: the Loss of the Legendary USS Harder, Naval Institute Press, .

External links
Covert operations in Northwest Borneo
Operation Python at Z Special Unit

Conflicts in 1943
Conflicts in 1944
20th century in Brunei
Special forces of Australia
Battles of World War II involving Australia